Archaeovaranus (meaning "ancient Varanus") is genus of varanid lizard from the early Eocene (Ypresian) Yuhuangding Formation of Hubei Province, China. The genus contains a single species, Archaeovaranus lii, known from a nearly complete skeleton. The holotype, which includes an intact skull, is associated but disarticulated. Archaeovaranus fills a gap in the varanid fossil record, as it represents a stem-varanid from the early Eocene of East Asia, and is the closest known relative of Varanus.

Discovery and naming 
The holotype specimen of Archaeovaranus, IVPP V 22770, was discovered at the Dajian locality of the Yuhuangding Formation near Danjiangkou, Hubei Province, China. 

The generic name, "Archaeovaranus," combines the Greek "archaīos," meaning "ancient," with a reference to the closely related Varanus. "Varanus" is derived from the Arabic "waral," meaning "lizard beast." The specific name, "lii," honors the paleontologist Chuankui Li, whose research included studies of the Archaeovaranus type locality.

Description 
The holotype specimen represents an adult individual, around 16 years old at the time of death. However, a lack of fusion at the distal ends of the humerus and femur suggest that the individual was still growing.

Taxonomy 
Archaeovaranus was found in the study to be the closest known relative of modern monitor lizards belonging to the genus Varanus.

Cladogram after Dong et al. 2022.

Paleoecology 
The mammals Rhombomylus, Advenimus, Asiocoryphodon and Danjiangia are also known from layers of the Yuhuangding Formation.

References 

Fossil taxa described in 2022
Eocene lizards
Fossils of China
Eocene Asia
Monitor lizards
Eocene reptiles of Asia
Prehistoric lizard genera